Lauren Selmon Roberts is an American filmmaker and film producer. She is the director of Rainbow Town, a documentary focused on orphans in war-torn Liberia.

Career
She is daughter of Kathryn and Dewey Selmon of Norman, Oklahoma. She completed her bachelor's degree in broadcast journalism from California State University, Fresno in May 2005. Afterwards, she graduated with a master of fine arts degree from the College of Mass Communication and Media Arts of Southern Illinois University Carbondale.

When she was 14 years old, she started to use the video camera. Roberts created her first video, an entry for a WNBA commercial when she was 15 years old. During this period, she started to play multiple roles in school such as reporting, producing, shooting and editing. After her graduation, she worked for local news channels.

In the meantime, she went to West Africa for a documentary. After a two-year stint working with war orphans & former child soldiers in Liberia, she decided to make her first full-length documentary, Rainbow Town in 2010. She was also the cinematographer and editor of the documentary. The film revolves around the true story of a woman who saved the lives of over 250 war orphans during Liberia's civil war. After receiving critical acclaim, the film was also honored with the award from the Directors Guild of America. It was later screened at New York Fashion Week, at the Museum of Tolerance International Film Festival and other national & international film festivals.

After the success of the film, she joined as a producer at NBCUniversal's in-house production company, 'Peacock Productions'. Since 2011, she worked as the assistant producer, associate producer and executive producer for several television serials, TV specials and documentaries.

Filmography

References

External links
 

Living people
American film directors
American film producers
California State University, Fresno alumni
Year of birth missing (living people)
American women film producers
American women film directors